Jermaine Rasheed Whitehead (born March 12, 1993) is a former American football free safety. He played college football at Auburn, and was signed by the San Francisco 49ers as an undrafted free agent in 2015. He was also a member of the Baltimore Ravens, Green Bay Packers, and Cleveland Browns.

College career
Whitehead attended Auburn University, where he played on the Auburn Tigers football team from 2011 to 2014.

College statistics

Professional career

San Francisco 49ers
After going undrafted in the 2015 NFL Draft, Whitehead signed with the San Francisco 49ers on May 5, 2015. On September 5, 2015, he was released by the 49ers during final team cuts. Whitehead was signed to the 49ers' practice squad the following day.

Baltimore Ravens
On December 23, 2015, the Baltimore Ravens signed Whitehead off the 49ers' practice squad. He was inactive for the last two games of the season. On April 19, 2016, Whitehead was re-signed by the Ravens. He was released by the Ravens on May 13, 2016.

Green Bay Packers
Whitehead was signed by the Green Bay Packers on May 18, 2016. On September 3, 2016, he was released by the Packers during final team cuts and was signed to the practice squad the next day. On October 24, 2016, he was promoted from the practice squad to the active roster. Whitehead made his NFL debut against the Atlanta Falcons in Week 8. On November 7, 2016, he was released by the Packers and was re-signed back to the practice squad. He signed a futures contract with the Packers on January 24, 2017.

On September 2, 2017, Whitehead was waived by the Packers and was signed to the practice squad the next day. He was promoted to the active roster on October 21, 2017.

Whitehead was re-signed on March 14, 2018. In Week 9 against the New England Patriots, Whitehead was ejected after slapping center David Andrews in the face mask. He was then released by the Packers on November 6, 2018.

Cleveland Browns
On November 7, 2018, Whitehead was claimed off waivers by the Cleveland Browns. On September 29, 2019, he had his first NFL career interception and forced fumble in a game against the Baltimore Ravens. Whitehead was waived on November 4, 2019 after posting "several threatening and racist messages for people who criticized him" following the team's loss to the Denver Broncos, a game in which he missed a number of crucial tackles. Whitehead later apologized for the messages.

NFL career statistics

References

External links
Green Bay Packers bio
Auburn Tigers bio

1993 births
Living people
Players of American football from Mississippi
People from Greenwood, Mississippi
American football safeties
Auburn Tigers football players
San Francisco 49ers players
Baltimore Ravens players
Green Bay Packers players
Cleveland Browns players